The eighth season of Frasier originally aired from October 24, 2000, to May 22, 2001, on NBC.

Cast

Main
 Kelsey Grammer as Frasier Crane
 Jane Leeves as Daphne Moon
 David Hyde Pierce as Niles Crane
 Peri Gilpin as Roz Doyle
 John Mahoney as Martin Crane

Recurring 
Edward Hibbert as Gil Chesterton
Patrick Kerr as Noel Shempsky
Tom McGowan as Kenny Daly

Special guest

Special appearance by
John Glenn as himself (Episode: "Docu.Drama")

Guest
Tushka Bergen as Miranda
Trevor Einhorn as Frederick Crane
Patrick Macnee as Cecil Hedley
Charlotte Ross as Monica
Illeana Douglas as Kenny's Wife
Barbara Babcock as Penelope Janvier
John Michael Higgins as William
Jennifer Coolidge as Frederica
Brian Klugman as Kirby Gardner
Bebe Neuwirth as Lilith Sternin

Episodes

References 

2000 American television seasons
2001 American television seasons
Frasier 08